1-Pyrroline-5-carboxylic acid (systematic name 3,4-dihydro-2H-pyrrole-2-carboxylic acid) is a cyclic imino acid. Its conjugate base and anion is 1-pyrroline-5-carboxylate (P5C). In solution, P5C is in spontaneous equilibrium with glutamate-5-semialdhyde (GSA). The stereoisomer (S)-1-pyrroline-5-carboxylate (also referred to as L-P5C) is an intermediate metabolite in the biosynthesis and degradation of proline and arginine.

In prokaryotic proline biosynthesis, GSA is synthesized from γ-glutamyl phosphate by the enzyme γ-glutamyl phosphate reductase. In most eukaryotes, GSA is synthesised from the amino acid glutamate by the bifunctional enzyme 1-pyrroline-5-carboxylate synthase (P5CS). The human P5CS is encoded by the ALDH18A1 gene. The enzyme pyrroline-5-carboxylate reductase converts P5C into proline

In proline degradation, the enzyme proline dehydrogenase produces P5C from proline, and the enzyme 1-pyrroline-5-carboxylate dehydrogenase converts GSA to glutamate. In many prokaryotes, proline dehydrogenase and P5C dehydrogenase form a bifunctional enzyme that prevents the release of P5C during proline degradation. In arginine degradation, the enzyme ornithine-δ-aminotransferase mediates the transamination between ornithine and a 2-oxo acid (typically α-ketoglutarate) to form P5C and an L-amino acid (typically glutamate). Under specific conditions, P5C may also be used for arginine biosynthesis via the reverse reaction of ornithine-δ-aminotransferase.

References 

Pyrrolines
Carboxylic acids